Radawczyk  is a village in the administrative district of Gmina Niedrzwica Duża, within Lublin County, Lublin Voivodeship, in eastern Poland.

Radawczyk used to have a large German population. There was a church of baptists ("kapela"), later transformed into a depot; it burnt down in 2001.

The Ciemięnga river flows through the village. The name of the village is related to two older nearby villages (Radawiec Mały and Radawiec Duży).

References

Villages in Lublin County